Zisis Ziagas (born 22 September 1972) is a Greek former professional footballer who played as a midfielder.

References

1972 births
Living people
Greek footballers
Iraklis Thessaloniki F.C. players
Athlitiki Enosi Larissa F.C. players
Association football midfielders
Super League Greece players
Footballers from Larissa